Willie Louis Sands (born 1949) is a senior United States district judge of the United States District Court for the Middle District of Georgia.

Education and career

Born in Bradley, Georgia, Sands received his Bachelor of Arts from Mercer University in 1971 and a Juris Doctor from Mercer University School of Law in 1974. He was a second lieutenant in the United States Army Reserve Signal Corps in 1974, remaining in the Reserve until 1980 reaching the rank of captain. He was an assistant district attorney of the Macon, Georgia Judicial Circuit from 1975 to 1978. He was an Assistant United States Attorney for the Middle District of Georgia from 1978 to 1987. He was in private practice in Macon from 1987 to 1991, and was a judge on the Superior Court, Macon Judicial District from 1991 to 1993.

Federal judicial service

On February 9, 1994, Sands was nominated by President Bill Clinton to a new seat on the United States District Court for the Middle District of Georgia created by 104 Stat. 5089. He was confirmed by the United States Senate on May 6, 1994, and received his commission on May 9, 1994. He served as chief judge from 2001 to 2006. He assumed senior status on April 12, 2014.

See also 
 List of African-American federal judges
 List of African-American jurists
 List of first minority male lawyers and judges in Georgia

Sources

1949 births
Living people
African-American judges
Assistant United States Attorneys
Georgia (U.S. state) state court judges
Judges of the United States District Court for the Middle District of Georgia
Mercer University alumni
Superior court judges in the United States
United States district court judges appointed by Bill Clinton
United States Army officers
20th-century American judges
21st-century American judges